Hypothyris is a genus of clearwing (ithomiine) butterflies, named by Jacob Hübner in 1821. They are in the brush-footed butterfly family, Nymphalidae.

Species
Arranged alphabetically within species groups:
Unknown species group
Hypothyris anastasia (Bates, 1862)
Hypothyris connexa (Hall, 1939)
Hypothyris coeno (Doubleday, 1847)
Hypothyris daphnis d'Almeida, 1945
Hypothyris euclea (Godart, 1819) – common ticlear
Hypothyris fluonia (Hewitson, 1854)
Hypothyris gemella Fox, 1971
Hypothyris leprieuri (Feisthamel, 1835)
Hypothyris lycaste (Fabricius, 1793) – round-spotted ticlear
Hypothyris mamercus (Hewitson, 1869)
Hypothyris mansuetus (Hewitson, 1860)
Hypothyris moebiusi (Haensch, 1903)
Hypothyris ninonia (Hübner, [1806])
Hypothyris semifulva (Salvin, 1869)
Hypothyris thea (Hewitson, 1852)
Hypothyris vallonia (Hewitson, [1853])
The Garsauritis species group
Hypothyris xanthostola (Bates, 1862)
The Rhodussa species group
Hypothyris cantobrica (Hewitson, 1876)

References

Ithomiini
Nymphalidae of South America
Nymphalidae genera
Taxa named by Jacob Hübner